Estelle Betty Manyolo (born 1938) is a Ugandan painter and printmaker.

Biography 

Betty Manyolo is a Muganda, and one of ten children. She studied art at the School of Fine Art at Makerere College. Later in her career, she worked as an artist for Uganda's Department of Health.

Work 

Betty Manyolo illustrated the book Awo olwatuuka.

Exhibitions 

Several of her linocut prints, along with an oil painting, were exhibited through the Harmon Foundation beginning in 1961; her work was also included in the Smithsonian Institution Traveling Exhibit of Contemporary African Printmakers from 1966 to 1968.

References

1938 births
Living people
Ugandan painters
Ugandan printmakers
Ugandan women painters
Women printmakers
20th-century painters
20th-century printmakers
20th-century women artists
21st-century painters
21st-century printmakers
21st-century women artists
Ganda people
Makerere University alumni